The 1907 Franklin Baptists football team represented Franklin College of Indiana during the 1907 college football season.

Schedule

References

Franklin
Franklin Grizzlies football seasons
Franklin Baptists football